Samuel Allen (born April 25, 1936) is a former professional baseball player for the Negro leagues. Allen was born in 1936 in Norfolk, Virginia. During his high school years he was a baseball and football player. In 1957, he played for the Kansas City Monarchs. In 1957, he would lead the league in runs scored. In 1958, he played for the Raleigh Tigers.  In 1959, he played for the Memphis Red Sox.  He was drafted into the US Army in 1960. For a period he was with the Army 82nd Airborne. In 2003, he was elected into the African American Hall of Fame.

References

1936 births
Living people
Kansas City Monarchs players
Memphis Red Sox players
Raleigh Tigers players
Baseball players from Norfolk, Virginia
United States Army soldiers
21st-century African-American people